Marco Antonio Servillo, known as Toni Servillo, is an Italian actor and theatrical director.

He has won the European Film Award for Best Actor twice, in 2008 for both Gomorrah and Il Divo and in 2013 for The Great Beauty, as well as winning the David di Donatello for Best Actor four times from 2002 to 2013. In 2020, The New York Times ranked him #7 on its list of the 25 Greatest Actors of the 21st Century.

Early life
Servillo was born on 25 January 1959 in Afragola, Campania. He is the brother of musician Peppe Servillo.

Career

His international breakthrough roles came in 2008 as Giulio Andreotti in Il Divo and Roberto's boss Franco in Gomorrah. Both films were nominated in the Golden Palm awards.

Between 2000 and 2007, he also directed several opera productions, including Cimarosa's Il marito disperato and Beethoven's Fidelio for the Teatro di San Carlo in Naples, and Mussorgsky's Boris Godunov at the Teatro Nacional de São Carlos in Lisbon, where in 2003 he also staged Richard Strauss's Ariadne auf Naxos.

In 2013, Servillo was selected as best actor at the 26th European Film Awards for his appearance in Paolo Sorrentino's film The Great Beauty.

In 2018 he portrayed Silvio Berlusconi and Ennio Doris in Sorrentino's Loro.

Personal life
Since the 1960s he has lived in Caserta, with his wife and his children.

Filmography

Film

Television

Awards and nominations

References

External links

20th-century Italian male actors
21st-century Italian male actors
David di Donatello winners
European Film Award for Best Actor winners
Italian male film actors
Italian theatre directors
Italian opera directors
Living people
Nastro d'Argento winners
People from Afragola
Year of birth missing (living people)